The long-billed myzomela (Myzomela longirostris) is a species of bird in the family Meliphagidae.
It is found on Goodenough Island (d'Entrecasteaux Islands, Papua New Guinea). It was formerly considered a subspecies of the red-collared myzomela (Myzomela rosenbergii), but was split as a distinct species by the IOC in 2021.

Its natural habitat is subtropical or tropical moist montane forests.

References

long-billed myzomela
Birds of the D'Entrecasteaux Islands
long-billed myzomela
long-billed myzomela
long-billed myzomela